The National Plan of Integrated Airport Systems (NPIAS) is an inventory of U.S. aviation infrastructure assets. NPIAS was developed and now maintained by the Federal Aviation Administration (FAA).

It identifies existing and proposed airports that are significant to national air transportation in the U.S., and thus eligible to receive federal grants under the Airport Improvement Program (AIP). It also includes estimates of the amount of AIP money needed to fund infrastructure development projects that will bring these airports up to current design standards and add capacity to congested airports. The FAA is required to provide Congress with a five-year estimate of AIP-eligible development every two years.

The NPIAS contains all commercial service airports, all reliever airports, and selected general aviation airports.

References

!
Federal Aviation Administration